Dzungariotherium is a genus of indricothere, an extinct group of large, hornless rhinos, which lived during the middle and late Oligocene of northwest China. The type species D. orgosense was described in 1973 based on fossilsmainly teethfrom Dzungaria in Xinjiang, northwest China.

Description

The teeth of D. orgosense (from which that species is mainly known) are 25 percent larger than those of Paraceratherium transouralicum, indicating that it was one of the largest known indricothere, but the teeth and skull were proportionally large compared to the body, making it smaller overall. Skull length range is 126-143 cm. The mass of a D. sp specimen was estimated to be ~ 20.6 metric tons. 

Paraceratherium  bugtiense and D. orgosense share features such as relatively slender maxillae and premaxillae, shallow skull roofs, mastoid-paroccipital processes that are relatively thin and placed back on the skull, a lambdoid crest, which extends less back, and an occipital condyle with a horizontal orientation. D. orgosense is distinguished from Paraceratherium species by the larger size of its teeth, and distinct crochets of its molars.

References

Prehistoric rhinoceroses
Prehistoric placental genera
Oligocene mammals of Asia
Oligocene rhinoceroses
Paleogene China
Fossils of China
Fossil taxa described in 1973